Osnaburg Township is one of the seventeen townships of Stark County, Ohio, United States.  The 2000 census found 5,886 people in the township, 4,257 of whom lived in the unincorporated portions of the township.

Geography
Located in the southeastern part of the county, it borders the following townships:
Nimishillen Township - north
Paris Township - east
Brown Township, Carroll County - southeast
Sandy Township - south
Pike Township - southwest corner
Canton Township - west
Plain Township - northwest corner

The village of East Canton is located in northwestern Osnaburg Township.

Name and history
The township's name reminds of the German city Osnabrück - the German part -brück ("bridge") was changed to -burg ("castle"), to avoid the letter "ü". It is the only Osnaburg Township statewide.

In 1833, Osnaburg Township contained one gristmill, seven saw mills, two tanneries, four stores, and one German and English book office.

Government

The township is governed by a three-member board of trustees, who are elected in November of odd-numbered years to a four-year term beginning on the following January 1. Two are elected in the year after the presidential election and one is elected in the year before it. There is also an elected township fiscal officer, who serves a four-year term beginning on April 1 of the year after the election, which is held in November of the year before the presidential election. Vacancies in the fiscal officership or on the board of trustees are filled by the remaining trustees.

References

External links
County website

Townships in Stark County, Ohio
Townships in Ohio